Maine is a given name. Notable people with the name include:

Maine mac Cerbaill (died 537), Irish king
Maine mac Néill (died 712), Irish king
Maine Mór, Irish founder of the kingdom of Uí Maine
Maine Munchaín, Irish dynast
Maine de Biran (1766–1824), French philosopher
Maine Mendoza (born 1995), Filipina comedian, actress and model